Jack Edwin Drake (July 29, 1934 – October 11, 2015) was an American politician in the Iowa State Representative from the 21st District. A Republican, he served in the Iowa House of Representatives from 1993 until his death. Drake was born and raised near Walnut, Iowa and lived in Griswold. Drake attended the University of Iowa.

, Drake served on several committees in the Iowa House – the Agriculture, Appropriations, and State Government committees.  He also served as the chair of the Agriculture and Natural Resources Appropriations Subcommittee.

Biography
Jack Drake was first elected in 1992. He was born on July 29, 1934, in Walnut, Iowa. His father, Wallace, and mother, Arlene, were both farmers. He attended grade school at Lincoln #2 Country School in Walnut. He graduated from Atlantic High School. Following graduation, he attended the University of Iowa.

In 1954, he married his wife, Shirley, and together they have raised four children – three of which still live in SW Iowa. The fourth lives in Nevada, Iowa. He and his wife Shirley have eleven grandchildren, and nine great-grandchildren

Drake attends Griswold United Methodist Church. He was the Chair of the Finance Committee and served on the Audit Committee. He was a former Sunday school teacher

He was Board Secretary of the Walnut Telephone Company. In addition, he was an active member of the Corn Growers Association, Soybean Association, NFIB, and Iowa Farm Bureau.

He was a former Board Member of the Pottawattamie County Zoning Board; the former President of the East Pottawattamie County Farm Bureau; and the former President of the Pottawattamie County Extension Council. Jack was active in 4-H and served as a leader of the organization at one time. Drake died on October 11, 2015 in hospital at Atlantic, Iowa.

Electoral history
*incumbent

References

External links

 Representative Jack Drake official Iowa General Assembly site
 
 Financial information (state office) at the National Institute for Money in State Politics
 Profile at Iowa House Republicans

Republican Party members of the Iowa House of Representatives
1934 births
2015 deaths
University of Iowa alumni
People from Pottawattamie County, Iowa
People from Cass County, Iowa
Farmers from Iowa